The 1949–50 Greek Football Cup was the eighth edition of the Greek Football Cup. The competition culminated with the Greek Cup Final, held at Leoforos Alexandras Stadium, Athens on 28 May 1950. The match was contested by AEK Athens and Aris, with AEK Athens winning by 4–0.

Calendar

Qualification round

First round

|-
|colspan="5" style="background-color:#D0D0D0" align=center|Central Greece/Islands Football Clubs Association
||colspan="2" rowspan="19" 

||colspan="2" rowspan="10" 

|-
|colspan="5" style="background-color:#D0D0D0" align=center|Patras/Western Greece Football Clubs Association
||colspan="2" rowspan="11" 

|-
|colspan="5" style="background-color:#D0D0D0" align=center|Crete Football Clubs Association
||colspan="2" rowspan="4" 

|-
|colspan="5" style="background-color:#D0D0D0" align=center|Thessaly Football Clubs Association
||colspan="2" rowspan="9" 

|-
|colspan="5" style="background-color:#D0D0D0" align=center|Macedonia Football Clubs Association
||colspan="2" rowspan="5" 

|-
|colspan="5" style="background-color:#D0D0D0" align=center|Eastern Macedonia Football Clubs Association
||colspan="2" rowspan="8" 

|}

* Victoria withdrew at the 33rd minute. That remained as the final score.

** Dorieus qualified for the next phase, where he would face a team from Central Greece, but resigned due to inability to cover the travel expenses of the Athenian team.

*** Aris Patras withdrew at the 70th minute. That remained as the final score.

****AEK Pyrgos withdrew at the 54th minute while the score was 1–1. Awarded to Lefkos Asteras Amaliadas.

Second round

|-
|colspan="5" style="background-color:#D0D0D0" align=center|Central Greece/Islands Football Clubs Association
||colspan="2" rowspan="3" 

||colspan="2" rowspan="8" 

||colspan="2" rowspan="5" 

|-
|colspan="5" style="background-color:#D0D0D0" align=center|Crete Football Clubs Association
||colspan="2" 
|-
|colspan="5" style="background-color:#D0D0D0" align=center|Macedonia Football Clubs Association
||colspan="2" rowspan="2" 

|-
|colspan="5" style="background-color:#D0D0D0" align=center|Eastern Macedonia Football Clubs Association
||colspan="2" rowspan="3" 

|}

* Iraklis Kallithea withdrew after the second draw.

Third round

|-
|colspan="5" style="background-color:#D0D0D0" align=center|Central Greece/Islands Football Clubs Association
||colspan="2" rowspan="5" 

|-
|colspan="5" style="background-color:#D0D0D0" align=center|Patras/Western Greece Football Clubs Association
||colspan="2" rowspan="4" 

||colspan="2" 
|-
|colspan="5" style="background-color:#D0D0D0" align=center|Thessaly Football Clubs Association
||colspan="2" rowspan="2" 

|-
|colspan="5" style="background-color:#D0D0D0" align=center|Macedonia Football Clubs Association
||colspan="2" rowspan="2" 

|}

* Prasina Poulia withdrew at the 70th minute.

Fourth round

|-
|colspan="3" style="background-color:#D0D0D0" align=center|Central Greece/Islands Football Clubs Association

|-
|colspan="3" style="background-color:#D0D0D0" align=center|Patras/Western Greece Football Clubs Association

|-
|colspan="3" style="background-color:#D0D0D0" align=center|Crete Football Clubs Association

|-
|colspan="3" style="background-color:#D0D0D0" align=center|Thessaly Football Clubs Association

|-
|colspan="3" style="background-color:#D0D0D0" align=center|Macedonia Football Clubs Association

|-
|colspan="3" style="background-color:#D0D0D0" align=center|Eastern Macedonia Football Clubs Association

|}

* Suspended due to incidents. Both teams were zeroed.

** Filippoi Kavala won 3–2 but were zeroed due to illeagal usage of a football player.

Fifth round

|-
|colspan="5" style="background-color:#D0D0D0" align=center|Central Greece/Islands Football Clubs Association
|| colspan="2" rowspan="4" 

|-
|colspan="5" style="background-color:#D0D0D0" align=center|Patras/Western Greece Football Clubs Association
|| colspan="2" rowspan="2" 

|-
|colspan="5" style="background-color:#D0D0D0" align=center|Crete Football Clubs Association
|| colspan="2" 
|-
|colspan="5" style="background-color:#D0D0D0" align=center|Thessaly Football Clubs Association
|| colspan="2" 
|-
|colspan="5" style="background-color:#D0D0D0" align=center|Eastern Macedonia Football Clubs Association
|| colspan="2" 
|}

* Pallesviakos qualified for the next phase, where he would face a team from Central Greece, but resigned due to inability to cover the travel expenses of the Athenian team.

** Suspended due to rainfall.

*** Suspended at the 43rd minute due to the withdrawal of Iraklis Heraklion.

Sixth round

|-
|colspan="3" style="background-color:#D0D0D0" align=center|Central Greece/Islands Football Clubs Association

|-
|colspan="3" style="background-color:#D0D0D0" align=center|Patras/Western Greece Football Clubs Association

|-
|colspan="3" style="background-color:#D0D0D0" align=center|Thessaly Football Clubs Association

|-
|colspan="3" style="background-color:#D0D0D0" align=center|Eastern Macedonia Football Clubs Association

|}

Knockout phase
In the knockout phase, teams play against each other over a single match. If the match ends up as a draw, extra time will be played and if the match remains a draw a replay match is set at the home of the guest team which the extra time rule stands as well. That procedure will be repeated until a winner occurs. The mechanism of the draws for each round is as follows:
The round of 16 is contested by the eight top teams of each association and the eight clubs that passed the qualification round.There are no seedings, and teams from the same group can be drawn against each other.

Bracket

Round of 16

||colspan="2" rowspan="5" 

||colspan="2" 
|}

Quarter-finals

||colspan="2" 

||colspan="2" 

|}

* AEK Athens won by draw.

Semi-finals

||colspan="2" 

|}

Final

The 8th Greek Cup Final was played at the Leoforos Alexandras Stadium.

References

External links
Greek Cup 1949-50 at RSSSF

Greek Football Cup seasons
Greek Cup
1949–50 in Greek football